Mesoruza is a monotypic moth genus of the family Noctuidae. Its only species, Mesoruza kuehni, is found in the Kai Islands and New Guinea. Both the genus and species were first described by Warren in 1913.

References

Acontiinae
Monotypic moth genera